Elizabeth, Lady Eastlake (17 November 1809 – 2 October 1893), born Elizabeth Rigby, was an English author, art critic and art historian, who made regular contributions for the Quarterly Review. She is known not only for her writing but also for her significant role in the London art world.

Life
Elizabeth Eastlake was born in Norwich into the large family of Edward and Anne Rigby. Her father, a physician and classical scholar, and her mother included her in their social life and conversation with prominent citizens and intellectuals.
 
Elizabeth was fond of drawing from a young age and continued studying art into her twenties, when she was taught to draw and etch by the artist Edward Daniell. She was privately educated and learnt French and Italian, but after an illness in 1827, she was sent to convalesce in Germany and Switzerland.  She stayed two years and started a lifetime of publication with a translation of Johann David Passavant's essay on English art; a second trip to Germany in 1835 led to an article on Goethe. After travelling to Russia and Estonia to visit a married sister, her published letters and her travel book A Residence on the Shores of the Baltic (1841) led to an invitation to write for the Quarterly Review by the editor, John Gibson Lockhart.

In 1842, the widowed Anne Rigby moved with her daughters to Edinburgh, where Elizabeth's literary career brought entry to an intellectual social circle including prominent figures such as Lord Jeffrey, John Murray and David Octavius Hill, who photographed her in a series of about 20 early calotypes, assisted by Robert Adamson. 

Despite a diary entry in 1846 saying there were many "compensations" for unmarried women, three years later, at 40, Elizabeth married Sir Charles Lock Eastlake, artist, connoisseur, Director of the National Gallery in London, and in 1853 the first president of the Photographic Society. She joined him in an active working and social life, entertaining artists such as Landseer and mixing with a wide range of well-known people, from Lord Macaulay to Lady Lovelace. Her habit of continental travel continued through the 1850s and 1860s as she and her husband toured several European countries in search of new acquisitions for the gallery.

In 1857, she published her much-scrutinised essay Photography, one of the earliest commentaries on it, effectively denying 'works of light' a place among the fine arts, and detailing its permeation of nineteenth-century culture, its social institutions and the home, pronouncing it “a household word and a household want”.

She continued to write prolifically, helping to popularise German art history in England, both as critic and as translator (Waagen and Kugler). Sometimes, she collaborated with her husband, and she wrote a memoir of him after his death in 1865. 

Italian art also absorbed her attention; Leonardo da Vinci, Michelangelo, Titian, Raphael and Dürer were the subjects of her Five Great Painters (1883). In 1895 her nephew Charles Eastlake Smith edited her Letters and Correspondence, the first volume of which at least was read by the late 19th century English novelist George Gissing in July of the following year.

Reputation
In the 20th century, aside from her Photography, she was remembered mostly for her scathing review of Jane Eyre, of which she strongly disapproved. She disputed the morality of the novel, writing that ‘the popularity of Jane Eyre is a proof how deeply the love for illegitimate romance is implanted in our nature’ and summarising with ‘It is a very remarkable book: we have no remembrance of another combining such genuine power with such horrid taste’. 

She is also known for her attacks on John Ruskin, assumed to be linked to her role as confidante to his estranged wife, Effie Gray. According to historian Rosemary Mitchell, however, her work as art historian and writer was significant and original. Mitchell considers Eastlake to have been a scholarly and perceptive critic, and Marion Lochhead regards Eastlake as a 'pioneer of feminine journalism', whereas Janice Schroeder decries her values supporting women's subordinate place in the class structure within British imperialism.

Works 
 A Residence on the Shores of the Baltic (1841); London, 1844. 
 Review of Jane Eyre by Eizabeth Rigby
 Music and The Art of Dress, two essays reprinted from the Quarterly Review (1852)
 Livonian Tales: The Disponent, The Wolves, The Jewess By the Author of Letters from the Baltic  New York: Harper & Brothers. 1856.  Fragile tan wrappers.  No. 85 - Library of Select Novels
 Photography 1857
 60 drawings by Elizabeth Rigby from the Tate Gallery
 The history of Our Lord as exemplified in works of art (1890)
 Baltische briefe...(Leipzig, F.A. Brockhaus, 1846)
 Journals and correspondence of Lady Eastlake (London, J. Murray, 1895)

In popular culture 
Elizabeth is portrayed by Emma Thompson in the film Effie Gray, the script of which was also written by Thompson.

See also 
 Anna Brownell Jameson
 John Gibson

Citations

References 
 
 Lady Eastlake and Edinburgh Society in The Scotsman, 4 December 1895
 National Galleries of Scotland
 Scran

External links

19th-century British writers
British art historians
1809 births
1893 deaths
Victorian women writers
Victorian writers
British women travel writers
British travel writers
Women art historians
Wives of knights
Historians of photography
British women historians
Writers from Norwich